Moray College is a further education college based in Elgin, in Moray, northeastern Scotland. It has 1,500 full-time students and 8,100 part-time students (based on 2009–2010 academic year). It employs approximately 370 staff (266 full-time) and is a college of the University of the Highlands and Islands.

History

In 1971 the Elgin Technical College was opened as a further education college by the local education authority. The name of the college changed to the Moray College of Further Education in 1978. 

When the Further and Higher Education Scotland Act was passed in 1992 the college left the ownership of the local education authority (a process known as incorporation) and the name was changed to simply Moray College.

The nature of study changed at Moray College in 1997 when it became a partner college of the UHI Millennium Institute, allowing it to offer a far wider range of subjects for study through networked courses. In 2011 the UHI Millennium Institute gained full university status, becoming the University of Highlands and Islands.

The main campus for the college is in central Elgin, with Learning Centres also located in Buckie and Forres.  Engineering and Construction are based within the Technology Centre campus in New Elgin.  This campus is also home to the Gas, Oil and Renewables Assessment Centre.

Alexander Graham Bell Centre 

The Alexander Graham Bell Centre is a 3-storey extension at Moray College UHI which includes a simulated ward area, fitted with healthcare equipment such as hoists, that can be used as part of training for nursing. The £6.5m facility was funded by Moray College UHI, NHS Grampian, Highlands and Islands Enterprise and the European Regional Development Fund. It has received an award in the Education Building or Project category at the prestigious Scottish Design Awards. The centre also has conference facilities, eight classrooms and a café.

Curriculum

Main subject areas taught at the college are art, business and administration, care and social sciences, communication and languages, computing and information technology, hairdressing, beauty and complementary therapies, hospitality, science, maths, sport, skills for life and technology. A number of additional subject areas are available through the college partnership with the University of the Highlands and Islands.

In 2011 the college launched an online whisky tasting course.

References

External links
Moray College UHI website
University of the Highlands and Islands website

Further education colleges in Scotland
Education in Moray
University of the Highlands and Islands
Educational institutions established in 1971
1971 establishments in Scotland
Elgin, Moray